Adrián Dalmau Vaquer (born 23 March 1994) is a Spanish professional footballer who plays as a forward for AD Alcorcón.

Club career
Born in Palma de Mallorca, Balearic Islands, Dalmau joined Real Madrid's youth setup in 2011 after starting out at CD San Francisco. The following year, he moved to neighbouring Rayo Vallecano, making his debut with the reserves on 25 November 2012 by coming on as a second-half substitute in a 0–2 Segunda División B home loss against CD Ourense.

Dalmau was loaned to Zamora CF also of the third division on 2 September 2013. On 8 July of the following year, he signed a one-year deal at Racing de Ferrol in the same tier after terminating his contract with Rayo.

A backup to Joselu, Dalmau still contributed eight goals as his team missed out on promotion in the play-offs. On 19 June 2015, he moved to another reserve team, RCD Espanyol B still in division three.

On 29 February 2016, after scoring 12 times in 25 matches, Dalmau was loaned to CD Numancia until June. He made his Segunda División debut on 6 March, replacing Jon Gaztañaga in the 1–0 away defeat against SD Ponferradina.

Dalmau was loaned to RCD Mallorca in a season-long deal, on 12 August 2016. The following 15 July, after suffering second-division relegation, he cut ties with Espanyol and joined Villarreal CF B.

In June 2018, Dalmau moved abroad and agreed to a three-year contract at Dutch Eredivisie side Heracles Almelo with the option of a fourth. With 19 goals, he finished third in the scoring charts in his only season; this included four goals on 16 February 2019 in a 6–0 home win over Fortuna Sittard, and a hat-trick on the last day in a 5–4 loss to SBV Excelsior also at the Polman Stadion.

In July 2019, after his club rejected an offer from Maccabi Tel Aviv FC, Dalmau signed a three-year deal with FC Utrecht of the same league for an undisclosed fee. He struggled heavily with injuries in his debut campaign, appearing in only eight competitive games.

Dalmau joined Sparta Rotterdam on 24 December 2021, on a five-month contract to be made effective the following January. On 11 August 2022, he returned to Spain with AD Alcorcón of the Primera Federación.

References

External links

1994 births
Living people
Spanish footballers
Footballers from Palma de Mallorca
Association football forwards
Segunda División players
Segunda División B players
Primera Federación players
Rayo Vallecano B players
Zamora CF footballers
Racing de Ferrol footballers
RCD Espanyol B footballers
CD Numancia players
RCD Mallorca players
Villarreal CF B players
AD Alcorcón footballers
Eredivisie players
Heracles Almelo players
FC Utrecht players
Sparta Rotterdam players
Spanish expatriate footballers
Expatriate footballers in the Netherlands
Spanish expatriate sportspeople in the Netherlands